Presidents' Day is a holiday in Botswana. Since 2006, it has been a one-day holiday held on the third Monday of July.  Previous to that, it was a two-day holiday, held on Monday and Tuesday of the 3rd week in July, but the Public Holidays Amendment of 2006 modified the holiday to a single day.  Nevertheless, many public and private institutions such as the Botswana Stock Exchange still typically observe a two-day holiday at this time of year.

See also
 Heads of state of Botswana 
 George Washington's Birthday, also known as Presidents' Day in the United States

References

Botswana culture
Society of Botswana
National holidays
July observances
Holidays and observances by scheduling (nth weekday of the month)